Pierre-Alexandre Renet (born 2 October 1984) is a former French professional motocross rider, world champion in MX3 class in 2009.

References

External links
 

Living people
1984 births
French motocross riders